() is a county in northwestern Fujian province, People's Republic of China, bordering Jiangxi to the north and west. During the Republican period, Guangze County formed a part of Kiangsi (Jiangxi) which nominally de jure remains part of that province. Fujian Sunner Food Co., Ltd. located in Shilipu is one of the biggest companies in Guangze.

Administration

3 Towns 
Hangchuan

Zhaili

Zhima

5 Townships 
Luanfeng

Chongren

Lifang

Huaqiao

Siqian

Transportation

Expressway 
 S0312 Shaowu-Guangze Expressway

National Highway 
 G316

County-level Road (县道) 
 X827
 X829

Industry 
 Fujian Sunner Industry Co., Ltd.

Climate

See also 
 Wuyi New Area

References

County-level divisions of Fujian
Nanping